Replikas is a Turkish rock band from Istanbul. The band features consist of Gökçe Akçelik (vocals, guitar), Barkın Engin (guitar), Selçuk Artut (bass guitar), Orçun Baştürk (drums) and Burak Tamer (electronics).

History
Their debut album, Köledoyuran was released in 2000, by the Ada Music label. Their second album, Dadaruhi followed in 2002.

The band's third album Avaz was produced by Wharton Tiers. The album was released in May 2005 by the Doublemoon label.

Alongside releasing albums and playing concerts, Replikas wrote music for films too. The first soundtrack by the band was in 2001 for the movie Maruf by Serdar Akar. In 2005, the band composed music for Kutluğ Ataman's movie titled İki Genç Kız which won them the best film music award by Turkish Film Critics Association in 2006. The soundtracks were collected into an album named Film Müzikleri which was released by Pozitif in October 2006.

Replikas band took part in Fatih Akin's documentary Crossing the Bridge: The Sound of Istanbul; pieces from their albums have been used in various short and feature-length movies.

The band recorded their fifth album Zerre in a complex that they transformed into a studio environment, formerly a prison located in Imbros. Peyote Music released Zerre in November 2008.

The sixth album Biz Burada Yok İken consists of covers from the 1965-75 Anatolian Pop period. Biz Burada Yok İken was released by Ada Music in April 2012.

Since March 2013, the band started to share unreleased previously recordings on SoundCloud audio archive page.

EP No:1, containing seven new instrumental tracks, was released in May 2013.  A box set, including remastered versions of Köledoyuran and Dadaruhi, and also EP No:1 was also released by Ada Music in May 2013.

Alfred Hitchcock's Blackmail - Live at Istanbul Modern was released in February 2014 from band's Bandcamp page.

Discography 
Studio albums
 Köledoyuran 2000
 Dadaruhi 2002
 Avaz 2005
 Film Müzikleri 2006
 Zerre 2008
 Biz Burada Yok İken 2012
 EP No:1 2013
 Box Set: Köledoyuran & Dadaruhi Remastered + EP No:1 2013
 Alfred Hitchcock's Blackmail - Live at Istanbul Modern 2014
Compilation albums
 Aksi İstikamet 1999
 Floralia Vol:4 2002
 The Vegetable Man 10 project 2003
 Crossing the Bridge: The Sound of Istanbul 2005
 Doublemoon Remixed 2007
 Rock Sınıfı 2008
 Kompile Karga 2010

References

External links 
Official Web Site

Turkish alternative rock groups
Musical groups from Istanbul
Turkish experimental rock groups
Musical groups established in 1996
1996 establishments in Turkey